Since the 1973 Women's Cricket World Cup, 147 women have represented the Australia national women's cricket team in  Women's One Day International cricket. This list includes all players who have played at least one ODI match and is initially arranged in the order of debut appearance. Where more than one player won their first cap in the same match, those players are initially listed alphabetically by last name at the time of debut (cap criteria used by CricInfo).

Key

Players
Statistics are correct as of 21 January 2023.

Notes
 Valerie Farrell played two One Day Internationals for the International XI women's cricket team before playing for Australia.
 Rhonda Kendall played twelve One Day Internationals for the International XI women's cricket team before playing for Australia.
 Jenny Owens played twelve One Day Internationals for the International XI women's cricket team before playing for Australia.
 Kim Garth played thirty-three One Day Internationals for the Ireland women's cricket team before playing for Australia.

See also
 List of Australia women Test cricketers
 List of Australia women Twenty20 International cricketers
 List of Australia national cricket captains

References

 
ODI cricketers,Women
Australia